United States v. Hubbard was a 1978 criminal court case charging Mary Sue Hubbard and several other members of the Church of Scientology with violations of various laws including:

Also included was 22 D.C. Code §§ 105, 1801(b) (Burglary, Aiding and Abetting).

All eleven defendants were found guilty and sentenced to both fines and imprisonment. The convictions were upheld on appeal.

Defendants
List from Grand Jury document.

Mary Sue Hubbard
Jane Kember
Morris Budlong
Henning Heldt
Duke Snider
Gregory Willardson
Richard Weigand
Mitchell Hermann aka Mike Cooper
Cindy Raymond
Gerald Bennett Wolfe
Sharon Thomas

Result
A series of sentencing orders dated Dec 11 1979 show some of the results of the trial.

See also
Operation Snow White
Operation Freakout
List of Guardian's Office operations
Scientology and the legal system

Notes

External links

1980 Sentencing memorandum for Jane Kember and Morris Budlong from wikisource

Scientology-related controversies
United States District Court for the District of Columbia cases
1978 in United States case law
Scientology litigation
1978 in religion
United States District Court case articles without infoboxes